The 2010 Canadian Mixed Curling Championship was held Nov. 14-21, 2009 at the Burlington Golf and Country Club in Burlington, Ontario.  Nova Scotia won its seventh Mixed title, and skip Mark Dacey won his second title with then-wife, Heather Smith-Dacey as his mate who won her third. The team's front end of Andrew Gibson and Jill Mouzar won their first mixed title.

Dacey and Smith-Dacey were scheduled to represent Canada at the 2010 World Mixed Doubles Curling Championship, but were not able to make it to the event due to the 2010 eruptions of Eyjafjallajökull.

Teams

Standings

Results
Draw 1
 12-6 
 9-4 /Northwest Territories
 8-5 
 8-4 

Draw 2
 7-6 
 9-4 
 8-5 

Draw 3
 7-5 
 7-5 
 7-6  (11)
 10-4 

Draw 4
 6-5  (11)
 10-4 
/Northwest Territories 7-2 

Draw 5
 8-7  (11)
 4-3 
 11-4 
 6-4 

Draw 6
 6-3 
 8-6 /Northwest Territories
 8-3 
 7-3 

Draw 7
 6-1 /Northwest Territories
 8-6  (11) 
 9-4 
 7-4 

Draw 8
 7-3 
 9-7 /Northwest Territories
 9-3 
 8-7  (11)

Draw 9
 10-7 
 9-2 
 7-4 
 7-2 

Draw 10
 7-6 
 5-2 
 8-2 /Northwest Territories
 7-5 

Draw 11
 10-3 /Northwest Territories
 8-2 
 8-7  (11)
 7-6 

Draw 12
 5-4 
 8-7  (11)
 9-6 
 9-3 /Northwest Territories

Draw 13
 7-1 
 7-2 
 8-4 
 7-4 

Draw 14
 9-8 
 6-4 
 11-2 /Northwest Territories
 6-3 

Draw 15
 6-2 
 8-5 
 6-4 
 10-6 /Northwest Territories

Draw 16
 5-4 
 7-5 
 8-7  (11)
 8-7  (11)

Draw 17
 7-6 /Northwest Territories (11)
 7-6 
 9-6 
 6-4

Playoffs

Sources
Official site

References

Mix
Canadian Mixed Curling Championship
Burlington, Ontario
2009 in Ontario
Curling in Ontario
November 2009 sports events in Canada